Sweet Sixteen may refer to:

Sweet sixteen (birthday), a party thrown in honor of a person's, typically a girl's, 16th birthday, primarily in the United States

Film and television 
Sweet Sixteen (1928 film), featuring Reginald Sheffield
Sweet Sixteen (1983 film), directed by Jim Sotos
Sweet Sixteen (2002 film), directed by Ken Loach
Sweet Sixteen (2016 film), Chinese-South Korean romance film
Sweet Sixteen (TV series), British sitcom with Penelope Keith
"Sweet Sixteen", a season 3 episode of the television series CSI: NY
"Sweet Sixteen" (Parks and Recreation), an episode of the American comedy television series Parks and Recreation

Music

Albums
 Sweet 16 (album), by Dutch girl group Lisa, Amy & Shelley
 Sweet Sixteen (Sarah Geronimo album), 2004
 Sweet Sixteen (The Huntingtons album), 1996
 Sweet Sixteen (Reba McEntire album), 1989
 Sweet Sixteen (Royal Trux album), 1997

Songs
 "Sweet Sixteen", a Hilary Duff song from the album Metamorphosis, 2003
 "Sweet 16" (Feeder song), theme song from computer game Gran Turismo
 "Sweet Sixteen" (song), by Billy Idol, from the album Whiplash Smile, 1987
 "Sweet Sixteen", blues song by B.B. King and Joe Josea
 "Sweet Sixteen", a song by Judy Garland, 1939
 "Sweet Sixteen", a song by Destiny's Child from the album The Writing's on the Wall
 "Sweet 16", a Green Day song from the album ¡Uno!

Other
 Sweet Sixteen (basketball), NCAA Division I men's basketball tournament
 Sweet 16 (group), a Bulgarian girl group
 SWEET16, an interpreted language in the Apple II computer
 Sweet Sixteen (KHSAA State Basketball Championship), Kentucky high school basketball tournaments
 Sweet Sixteen (Buffy novel), a 2002 novel based on the television series Buffy the Vampire Slayer
Sweet Sixteen (Abdullahi novel), a 2017 novel by Bolaji Abdullahi
 Sweet Sixteen (apple), a variety of apple
 Sweet 16, a slang name for a 16-gauge shotgun
 Sweet 16, a slang term for the M16 rifle and early corresponding maintenance manual

See also
 "Sweet Little Sixteen"
 "Sweet Sixteen and Never Been Kissed"